The women's pole vault event at the 2014 Asian Games was held at the Incheon Asiad Main Stadium, Incheon, South Korea on 30 September.

Schedule
All times are Korea Standard Time (UTC+09:00)

Records

Results

References

Results

Pole vault women
2014 women